Since Scotland's first international association football match on 30 November 1872, 33 players have scored three goals (a hat-trick) or more in a game. The first player to do so was John McDougall, in a match against England on 2 May 1878. The most goals scored by a single player in a match is five, scored by Joe Harper in a friendly against a Canada Olympic team on 13 June 1967 (this match was retrospectively reclassified as full international in 2021), although some sources credit Hughie Gallacher with a fifth goal in the 1928–29 British Home Championship match against Ireland on 23 February 1929. Denis Law is the only player to have scored four goals in a single match more than once. Robert Smyth McColl, Law and Gallacher are tied for the most hat-tricks for Scotland's international team, with three hat-tricks each.

The last player to score a hat-trick for Scotland was John McGinn, in a UEFA Euro 2020 qualifying match against San Marino on 13 October 2019. McGinn, Steven Fletcher, Robert Snodgrass and James Forrest all scored hat-tricks for Scotland during the 2010s. The first of these hat-tricks ended a long wait for a Scotland hat-trick, as the previous one was registered when Colin Stein scored four goals in the 8–0 1970 FIFA World Cup qualifying win over Cyprus on 17 May 1969.

Scotland have conceded seven hat-tricks in total, with the first one scored on 2 April 1955 by Dennis Wilshaw in a 1954–55 British Home Championship match against England. Scotland had not conceded a hat-trick for the first 83 years of international matches, a total of 244 matches. Nico Claesen of Belgium was the first player from outside the Home Nations to score a hat-trick against Scotland, in the UEFA Euro 1988 qualifying match on 1 April 1987. Scotland had only conceded four hat-tricks until the 2003–04 season when hat-tricks were scored against them in two successive matches, first by Ruud van Nistelrooy in a UEFA Euro 2004 qualifying playoff match against the Netherlands, and then by Robert Earnshaw in a friendly against Wales.

Hat-tricks for Scotland
Key

Table
Wartime internationals, not regarded as official matches, are not included in the list.
The result is presented with Scotland's score first.

Hat-tricks conceded by Scotland
Wartime internationals, not regarded as official matches, are not included in the list. The result is presented with Scotland's score first.

Scotland have conceded seven hat-tricks, four of which have been scored by players from the Home Nations.

Notes

 A full list of Scotland results for 1872–1880, 1881–1890, 1891–1900, 1901–1910, 1911–1920, 1921–1930, 1931–1939, 1946–1950, 1951–1955, 1956–1960, 1961–1965, 1966–1970, 1971–1975, 1976–1980, 1981–1985, 1986–1990, 1991–1995, 1996–2001, 2002–2005, 2006–2010, 2011–2015, 2016–2020, 2021 are listed on the RSSSF website. Retrieved 14 October 2021.
 Hughie Gallacher is credited with Scotland's sixth goal in some sources, although RSSSF credit it to Alex James.
 This is Scotland's only hat-trick in a game that they lost.

References
Specific

General

Hat-tricks
Scotland
Scotland